Downholland Cross is a small village in the civil parish of Downholland in the county of Lancashire on the West Lancashire Coastal Plain in England. It is to the north of Lydiate on the A5147 and the Leeds and Liverpool Canal.

The Downholland cross was reinstated by the Parish Council on the suggestion of Stephen Henders, parish councillor at the time, to mark the millennium. As 'Downholland', the village was noted in the Domesday Book.

See also

Listed buildings in Downholland
Downholland

References

External links

 https://web.archive.org/web/20050410001109/http://www.downhollandpc.org.uk/history.html

Villages in Lancashire
Geography of the Borough of West Lancashire